Charles Wesley (1707–1788) was an English Methodist leader.

Charles Wesley may also refer to:
 Charles Wesley junior (1757–1834), English organist and composer, his son 
 Charles H. Wesley (1891–1987), American historian and writer
 Charles Wesley (baseball) (1896–1944), American baseball player

See also